Jingning may refer to two counties of the People's Republic of China:

Jingning County, Gansu
Jingning She Autonomous County, Zhejiang